In mathematics, a Fermat quintic threefold is a special quintic threefold, in other words a degree 5, dimension 3 hypersurface in 4-dimensional complex projective space, given by the equation

.

This threefold, so named after Pierre de Fermat, is a Calabi–Yau manifold.

The Hodge diamond of a non-singular quintic 3-fold is

Rational curves
 conjectured that the number of rational curves of a given degree on a generic quintic threefold is finite. The Fermat quintic threefold is not generic in this sense, and  showed that  its lines are contained in 50 1-dimensional families of the form 
 
There are 375 lines in more than one family, of the form 
 

References

3-folds
Complex manifolds